Chamberlaine is a surname. Notable people with the surname include:

John Chamberlaine (1745–1812), antiquary and acted as keeper of George III's drawings, coins and medals from 1791 until his death in 1812
Nicholas Chamberlaine (1632–1715), priest in the Church of England known for his charitable donations
Nicholas Chamberlaine Technology College, state secondary school with technology college status in the town of Bedworth, Warwickshire, England

See also
Chamberlain (disambiguation)
Chamberlin (disambiguation)
Chamberlayne (disambiguation)
Chamberlen